The white-spotted slimy salamander (Plethodon cylindraceus) is a species of salamander in the family Plethodontidae endemic to the Eastern United States. It is one of 55 species in the genus Plethodon, and was one of the first to be described of its cogeners.

Distribution
This species is found in the Virginia Piedmont and Blue Ridge physiographic provinces of Virginia and North Carolina, west to the French Broad River, and south to the northern Piedmont of South Carolina, and parts of the Valley and Ridge physiographic province of the Appalachian Mountains in western Virginia and extreme eastern West Virginia, and in a small area of the Atlantic Coastal Plain of eastern Virginia.

Its natural habitat is temperate forest, and is threatened by habitat loss.

References

Plethodon
Salamander, white-spotted slimy
Salamander, white-spotted slimy
Amphibians described in 1825
Taxonomy articles created by Polbot